Nugget Falls, also known as Nugget Creek Falls or Mendenhall Glacier Falls, is a waterfall downstream of the Nugget Glacier, at the base of Bullard Mountain, in the U.S. state of Alaska. The lake then drains via Mendenhall River into the Inside Passage. The waterfall is fed by Nugget Creek, which is in turn fed by the Nugget Glacier, a tributary glacier on the mountainside east of Auke Bay. The creek cascades down towards Mendenhall Lake, forming a hanging valley, then plunges over the falls to the lake. Prior to the recession of Mendenhall Glacier, it was said that the falls would drop "directly on the glacier", or that the "glacier covered the waterfall".

References

Landforms of Juneau, Alaska
Waterfalls of Alaska